W279AQ (103.7 FM) is a radio station in St. Louis, Missouri, branded as "BIN 103.7". Owned by Educational Media Foundation, the station is operated by iHeartMedia via a leasing agreement. Its transmitter is located in Shrewsbury and operates from studios in St. Louis south of Forest Park. It broadcasts an all-news radio format under iHeartMedia's Black Information Network, targeting St. Louis's African American community.

History

2013-2015: Rock 
In early June 2014, W279AQ began testing its signal on the Crestwood FM Tower in Shrewsbury and began simulcasting KLOU's HD2 sub-channel, which dropped its 50s/60s hits format and began stunting with songs featuring the word "man" in the title. On June 16, the stunting shifted to a loop of Rick Astley's "Never Gonna Give You Up". Finally, on June 19, at 1:03 p.m., KLOU-HD2/W279AQ flipped to Active Rock as "Louie 103-7". The move was to attract younger male listeners away from Emmis Communications' KSHE and KPNT, but the attempt proved to be a failure.

2015-2017: Contemporary Christian 
On November 19, 2015, W279AQ/KLOU-HD2 began stunting with Christmas music. At Midnight on December 28, 2015, W279AQ/KLOU-HD2 flipped to contemporary Christian as "Up 103-7".

2017-2020: Urban AC 
On May 24, 2017, at 6 a.m., after playing "No Man Is an Island" by Tenth Avenue North, KLOU-HD2/W279AQ began stunting again, this time with songs featuring the word "magic" in the title. On May 26, 2017, at 10:37 a.m., W279AQ switched its primary feed to KMJM-FM's HD2 sub-channel, and flipped to Urban AC as "Majic 103.7", returning the heritage brand to the market for the first time since November 2014, when KMJM-FM flipped to classic hip hop and rebranded as "The Beat" (another heritage brand in the St. Louis market). The first song on the newly revived "Majic" was "Family Affair" by Mary J. Blige.  This is the fourth incarnation for the "Majic" branding in St. Louis, as it originated in 1979 on 107.7, then moved to 104.9 in 1997, and then to 100.3 in 2012 before the format was dropped two years later.

2020-present: All-News 
On July 17, 2020, at 10 a.m., the Urban AC format and “Majic” branding was moved back to 104.9 FM, displacing the alternative-formatted “ALT 104.9.” On July 27, at Midnight, KATZ-FM-HD2/W279AQ flipped to the Black Information Network all-news service.

References

External links

µW279AQ
Black Information Network stations
All-news radio stations in the United States